The Famatina tuco-tuco (Ctenomys famosus) is a species of rodent in the family Ctenomyidae. It is endemic to northern Argentina. The common name of the species comes from the municipality, department and mountain range of the same name at the type locality.

References

Mammals of Argentina
Tuco-tucos
Endemic fauna of Argentina
Mammals described in 1920
Taxa named by Oldfield Thomas